Muqaddam is an Arabic and Sufi title.

Muqaddam or Mukaddam or Moqaddam or Moqadam or Mokeddem or Mokadem or Mükeddem may also refer to:

People
 Abdullah Mukaddam is a Pakistani cricketer.
 Ahmad Khan Muqaddam is an Iranian governor.
 Ali Mukaddam is a Canadian actor.
 Hakim El Mokeddem is a French footballer.
 Ismael Mokadem is a Moroccan footballer
 Malika Mokeddem is an Algerian writer.
 Maryam Moqadam is an Iranian actress.
 Muhammad al-Faqih al-Muqaddam is a Yemeni Sufi.

Places
 Moqaddam is a village in Iran.
 Bir El Mokadem is a town and commune in Algeria.
 Bir Mokadem District is a district in Algeria.
 Qeshlaq-e Moqaddam Shabandeh is a village in Iran.
 Safra-ye Moqaddam is a village in Iran.

Geography
 Wadi Muqaddam is a river in Sudan.

History
 Moqaddam family is an old dynasty in Iran.

See also
 Moghaddam